The End of the World Party is the second studio album by American electronicore band I See Stars. It was released on February 22, 2011 through Sumerian Records.

Background 
The album was first announced to be in the works on October 8, 2010, through a statement posted by AbsolutePunk. The album was not mentioned again until the release of a video update on Sumerian Records' YouTube page, released on November 6, 2010.

The title track of the album, "The End of the World Party", was released on December 6, 2010, and the song could be unlocked by "liking" the Sumerian Records Facebook page. The track list was announced on January 14, 2011.

The album's release date of February 22, 2011 was announced through I See Stars' Merch Connection Inc. page, where they released pre-order packages on January 15, 2011. On February 1, 2011, Alternative Press started streaming the song "Wonderland" on their website.

Track listing 
All lyrics written by Andrew and Devin Oliver, all music composed by I See Stars.

References to other media

"The Common Hours II" main beat is taken from the song "Not Today Bish", a previous demo song from I See Stars. "The Common Hours II" also contains a verse from the song "Green Light Go!", a song from I See Stars' debut EP Green Light Go!.

Chart positions

Personnel
Credits for The End of the World Party adapted from Allmusic.

I See Stars
 Devin Oliver – clean vocals
 Brent Allen – lead guitar
 Jimmy Gregerson – rhythm guitar
 Jeff Valentine – bass guitar
 Andrew Oliver – drums, percussion, backing vocals
 Zach Johnson – unclean vocals, keyboards, synthesizers, sequencer, programming

Production
 Cameron Mizell – production, engineering
 Matt Dalton – additional recording
 Joey Sturgis – mastering at The Foundation Recording Studios, Connersville, IN

Management and artwork
 Adam Mott and Mark Weiss (Plant Management, LLC) and Bret Disend and Brent Mulligan (Ozone Entertainment) – management
 Mike Marquis (Precision Agency) – North America, Japan and Australia booking
 Mark Ngui (Creative Artists Agency) – UK and Mainland Europe booking
 Scott Padell (Padell Business Management) – business management
 Mike McKoy (Serling, Rooks & Ferrara) – legal representation
 Unlimited Design and Daniel McBride – artwork and layout
 Shawn Keith – A&R

References 

2011 albums
I See Stars albums
Sumerian Records albums